The Time is a South Korean television series starring Kim Jung-hyun, Seohyun, Kim Jun-han and Hwang Seung-eon. It aired on MBC from July 25 to September 20, 2018.

Synopsis
A man who is terminally ill and facing death does everything that he can in his last days to help a woman whose life he ruined.

Cast

Main
Kim Jung-hyun as Cheon Soo-Ho
Son of W Group's CEO, and CEO of a restaurant. He is seen as a perfect man. His time is running out due to his failing health.
Seohyun as Seol Ji-hyun
A bright and optimistic woman who becomes the breadwinner of a house at a young age. Her time hasn't moved on since the death of her sister.
Kim Jun-han as Shin Min-seok
Ji-hyun's boyfriend. A lawyer of W Group's legal team. He is seen as a trustworthy person. 
Hwang Seung-eon as Eun Chae-ah
Soo-Ho's fiancé. Only daughter of the CEO of Taeyang Group. Her obsession with Soo-Ho causes an accident and she hides behind manipulated time.

Supporting

Cheon Su-ho's family
 Choi Jong-hwan as CEO Cheon
CEO of W Group. Soo-Ho's father.
Jeon Soo-kyeong as Jang Ok-soon
 W Group's madam and Soo-Ho's stepmother. 
 Seo Hyun-woo as Cheon Soo-chul
 Soo-Ho's elder half-brother.

Seol Ji-hyun's family
Kim Hee-jung as Yang Hee-seok
Ji-hyun's immature mother. 
 Yoon Ji-won as Seol Ji-eun
Ji-hyun's younger sister.

People around Cheon Su-ho
 Jo Byung-gyu as Kim Bok-kyu
 Joo In-young as Manager Hong
 Kim Yong-joon as Chef Wang
Kang Min-ah as Miss Yang

People around Seol Ji-hyun
Ahn Ji-hyun as Oh Young-hee
Kim Jung-tae as Geum Tae-sung 
A loan shark. Yang Hee-seok's ex-lover. 
 Heo Jung-do as Nam Dae-chul

People around Shin Min-seok
Choi Deok-moon as Nam Dae-chul 
Head of W Group's legal team.

Production
Jeon So-min was offered the lead female role but declined.
The script reading was held on April 28, 2018.
On August 26, 2018, it was announced that lead actor Kim Jung-hyun dropped out of the cast due to health concerns. His agency revealed that there would be no replacement for him and the production crew was working on revising the script for his character to naturally fall out of the story. He officially finished filming on September 3.

Original soundtrack

Part 1

Part 2

Part 3

Part 4

Part 5

Part 6

Controversy 
In July 2018, Kim Jung-Hyun was involved in a controversy over his "emotionless" behavior during a press conference. His agency, O& Entertainment, defended him by stating that "Because [Kim Jung Hyun] is spending a lot of time thinking about his character, immersing himself into the life of someone terminally ill every day, he had difficulty maintaining his [physical and mental] condition, and unintentionally made a mistake."  In 2021 Kim released an apology letter regarding his behavior during that period, after a local tabloid claimed that he allegedly requested to remove several scenes that included physical contact with his then co-star.

Ratings
 In the table below,  represent the lowest ratings and  represent the highest ratings.
 NR denotes that the drama did not rank in the top 20 daily programs on that date.
 N/A denotes that the rating is not known.

Episodes did not air on August 15 due to the broadcast of the 2018 Asian Games: Soccer Men's Tournament - Preliminary Group E match between South Korean and Bahrain.
Episodes did not air on August 23 due to coverage of the 2018 Asian Games.

Awards and nominations

Notes

References

External links
  

 

MBC TV television dramas
2018 South Korean television series debuts
2018 South Korean television series endings
Korean-language television shows
South Korean romance television series
South Korean melodrama television series